John Gordon Mills (born 23 February 1960) is a former New Zealand rugby union player. A hooker, Mills represented Canterbury and Auckland at a provincial level, and was a member of the New Zealand national side, the All Blacks, on their 1984 tour of Fiji. He made two appearances for the All Blacks but did not play any test matches.

References

1960 births
Living people
New Zealand rugby union players
New Zealand international rugby union players
Rugby union players from Auckland
People educated at Auckland Grammar School
Canterbury rugby union players
Auckland rugby union players
Rugby union hookers